Pathros (Koine) refers to Upper Egypt, primarily the Thebaid where it extended from Elephantine fort to modern Asyut north of Thebes. Gardiner argues it extended to the north no farther than Abydos. It is mentioned in the Hebrew Bible in Jeremiah 44:1 and 15; Isaiah 11:11; and Ezekiel 29:14, 30:14. It is the homeland of the "Pathrusim". 

The name is a loan from Egyptian pꜣ tꜣ-rsy "the southern land" (e.g., pBritish Museum EA 10375, line 16; cf. Sahidic Coptic  and Bohairic Coptic .)

See also
 Generations of Noah

Weblinks 

 Joachim Friedrich Quack: Patros (2021). In: Michaela Bauks, Klaus Koenen, Michael Pietsch, Stefan Alkier (Hrsg.): Das wissenschaftliche Bibellexikon im Internet (WiBiLex), Stuttgart 2006 ff., Zugriffsdatum: 18. März 2022.

References

Geography of ancient Egypt
Hebrew Bible places
Upper Egypt